Luigi del Gallo marquess di Roccagiovine (12 July 1922 – 12 May 2011) was an Italian Prelate of Catholic Church.

Son of Alessandro del Gallo Marquess of Roccagiovine and Maria Rosaria Lepri Marquise of Rota, Roccagiovine was born in Rome and was ordained a priest on 19 March 1950. He belonged to Roman noble family of the Marquesses of Roccagiovine. Del Gallo was appointed Titular Bishop of Camplum as well as an official of the Diocese of Rome ond 20 December 1982 and consecrated 6 January 1983. Roccagiovine retired as an official of the Diocese of Rome in 1997.

See also
Diocese of Rome
List of marquesses in Italy

References

External links
Catholic-Hierarchy

20th-century Italian titular bishops
1922 births
2011 deaths
Margraves of Italy